Hollywood Wives may refer to:

 Hollywood Wives (novel), a 1983 novel by Jackie Collins
 Hollywood Wives (miniseries), a 1985 television miniseries based on the novel

See also
 Hollywood Wives: The New Generation, a 2003 television film